Ozzie Knezovich (born March 30, 1963) is an American politician and law enforcement official formerly serving as sheriff of Spokane County, Washington. He was first appointed to the position in 2006 and has since been re-elected four times. Knezovich is a member of the Republican Party.

Career
Following the resignation of Mark Sterk in 2006, Knezovich was appointed to complete his term as sheriff of Spokane County, Washington. Knezovich had worked with the Spokane County Sheriff's Office for ten years, but was considered an outsider candidate. The local Republican Party and the outgoing sheriff both endorsed Cal Walker, the Spokane Valley Chief of Police. Walker unsuccessfully ran against Knezovich in the Republican primary later that year, and Knezovich has remained in office ever since.

During the 2016 presidential election, Knezovich supported Donald Trump, while questioning his quality as a candidate. Knezovich stated of the 2016 presidential candidates, "I look at it, and I say, 'Is this the best we can field?' It kind of speaks to the level of people that are willing to run for office anymore."

At a March 2017 political rally, Knezovich praised President Trump and blamed former president Barack Obama for violence committed against law enforcement officers. Knezovich told the crowd, "never in my history have we been hunted and assassinated, and I blame Barack Obama." Knezovich also accused Governor of Washington Jay Inslee of violating his oath of office by signing an executive order prohibiting state agencies from assisting in enforcement federal immigration laws. The Spokesman-Review later reported that murder of law enforcement officers reached historic lows during the Obama administration, and that Inslee's executive order did not apply to sheriff's departments. Knezovich stood by his remarks.

Following a school shooting at Freeman High School in Rockford, Washington in 2017, Knezovich held a press conference in which he blamed the media and elected officials for "a counterculture of violence, a culture that is enamored with school shooting." He also criticized violent video games and gang culture, while asserting that guns were not to blame. Knezovich had previously blamed the media and activists for violence following the 2016 shooting of Dallas police officers.

During the 2020 Kootenai County sheriff election, Knezovich initially endorsed Kim Edmondson for Sheriff. Edmondson ended up losing in the primary election to Robert "Bob" Norris. Knezovich went silent on the matter, until Sept. of 2020 when he endorsed Independent candidate, Mike Bauer. Shortly after his endorsement, he pulled his support for Bauer after receiving an email that had connected Bauer with Ammon Bundy. Bauer denied these claims.

Electoral history

2006

2010

2014

2018
In 2018, Knezovich was challenged for re-election by Scott Maclay, a respiratory therapist who had legally changed his name to DumpOzzie Dot Com in protest of the sheriff. Maclay had been a frequent critic of Knezovich and a regular attendee of Spokane Valley City Council meetings. Knezovich described Maclay as a "psychopath," and was quoted as saying, "I truly expect him to try to kill me."

After advancing to the general election, Maclay died in a motorcycle crash in Idaho. According to the Spokane County Auditor, his death occurred too close to the election to have his name removed from the ballot.

References

External links
Sheriff Ozzie Knezovich , Spokane County, WA.

Washington (state) sheriffs
Politicians from Spokane, Washington
Living people
1963 births
Washington (state) Republicans